Kŏmsalli station is a railway station in Kŏmsan-dong, greater Hyesan city, Ryanggang province, North Korea, on the Paektusan Ch'ŏngnyŏn Line of the Korean State Railway.

The station, along with the rest of the Pongdu-ri-Hyesanjin- section, was opened by the Chosen Government Railway on 1 November 1937.

On 9 October 2006 an underground nuclear test was conducted at P'unggye-ri in Kilju County, causing the closure of the line for 3-4 months.

Operations at this station are primarily focussed on freight service.

References

Railway stations in North Korea